Marina Cordenons  (born 12 January 1969) is an Italian footballer who played as a defender for the Italy women's national football team. She was part of the team at the 1991 FIFA Women's World Cup. On club level she played for Pordenone in Italy.

References

External links
 

1969 births
Living people
Italian women's footballers
Italy women's international footballers
Place of birth missing (living people)
1991 FIFA Women's World Cup players
Women's association football defenders